The Abu Dhabi National Exhibition Centre (commonly abbreviated ADNEC) is an exhibition centre in Abu Dhabi. It was opened by Sheikh Khalifa bin Zayed bin Sultan Al Nahyan, President of the United Arab Emirates on February 18, 2007. It was designed by the international architecture firm, RMJM. The venue is the largest exhibition centre in the Middle East with a total space of 153,678m2 indoor and outdoor space. ADNEC has a large seating capacity in its several locations in the venue. This includes, 12 interconnected exhibition halls, an atrium, concourse space, a 6000 capacity ICC, two conference halls as well 21 meeting rooms. Marina Hall, due to open in Autumn 2022, will be the largest hall of its kind in the region, a 10,000sqm space that enables organisers to create showcases both on and off the water. The hall will be connected to ADNEC via a footbridge and easily accessible from Khaleej Al Arabi Street.

The exhibition centre has stimulated development around it, most notable the Capital Centre and Capital Gate projects.

References

External links 
 Abu Dhabi National Exhibitions Company

Convention centers in the United Arab Emirates
Buildings and structures in Abu Dhabi